Henryk Skowronek (25 June 1923 – 26 October 1981) was a Polish weightlifter. He competed in the men's featherweight event at the 1952 Summer Olympics.

References

1923 births
1981 deaths
Polish male weightlifters
Olympic weightlifters of Poland
Weightlifters at the 1952 Summer Olympics
Sportspeople from Ruda Śląska
20th-century Polish people